On September 16, 1816, Representative-elect Henry B. Lee (DR) of  died before the start of the 15th Congress, to which he'd been elected.  A special election was held prior to the beginning of the first session of Congress to fill the resulting vacancy.

Special election

Tallmadge took his seat on December 1, at the start of the First Session of the 15th Congress.

See also
List of special elections to the United States House of Representatives

References

New York 04
1817
New York 1817 04
New York 04
United States House of Representatives
United States House of Representatives 1817 04